Department of Sundarban Affairs is a ministerial office jurisdicted by the  Government of West Bengal. It is mainly used for promoting social, economic and cultural advancement of people residing in the Sundarban areas of the districts of North & South 24 Parganas.

Activities
In terms of Rules of Business framed under Article 166(3) of the Constitution of India , this department performs the following functions of the Government:
 Promotion of socio - economic and Cultural Advancement of people residing in the Sundarban areas of the District of North 24 Parganas and South 24 Parganas
Financing, regulation and inspection of bodies established for the purpose to be made.
All matters in connection with or in relation to the Constitution of India and functioning of the Sundarban Development Board. 
Co-ordination of development schemes and projects such as:
i) Livelihoods:--> Agriculture, Pisciculture, Forestry;
ii) Water supply and sanitation;
iii) Disaster risk management and erosion control ;
iv) Energy ;
v) Transportation;
vi) Education;
vii) Awareness creation etc in the Sundarban areas of the District of North and South 24 Parganas.

References 

Government of West Bengal
Government departments of West Bengal
Sundarbans